Elm Branch may refer to:

Elm Branch (East Fork Tebo Creek), a stream in Missouri
Elm Branch (Salt River), a stream in Missouri
Elm Branch (Wyaconda River), a stream in Missouri